

Events

Pre-1600
 661 – The Rashidun Caliphate is effectively ended with the assassination of Ali, the last caliph.
1531 – The 6.4–7.1  Lisbon earthquake kills about thirty thousand people.
1564 – The Council of Trent establishes an official distinction between Roman Catholicism and Protestantism.
1564 – The Grand Duchy of Lithuania defeats the Tsardom of Russia in the Battle of Ula during the Livonian War.

1601–1900
1699 – For the first time, the Ottoman Empire permanently cedes territory to the Christian powers.
1700 – The 8.7–9.2  Cascadia earthquake takes place off the west coast of North America, as evidenced by Japanese records.
1788 – The British First Fleet, led by Arthur Phillip, sails into Port Jackson (Sydney Harbour) to establish Sydney, the first permanent European settlement on Australia. Commemorated as Australia Day.
1808 – The Rum Rebellion is the only successful (albeit short-lived) armed takeover of the government in New South Wales.
1837 – Michigan is admitted as the 26th U.S. state.
1841 – James Bremer takes formal possession of Hong Kong Island at what is now Possession Point, establishing British Hong Kong.
1855 – Point No Point Treaty is signed in Washington Territory.
1856 – First Battle of Seattle: Marines from the  drive off American Indian attackers after all-day battle with settlers.
1861 – American Civil War: The state of Louisiana secedes from the Union.
1863 – American Civil War: General Ambrose Burnside is relieved of command of the Army of the Potomac after the disastrous Fredericksburg campaign. He is replaced by Joseph Hooker.
  1863   – American Civil War: Governor of Massachusetts John Albion Andrew receives permission from the Secretary of War to raise a militia organization for men of African descent.
1870 – Reconstruction Era: Virginia is readmitted to the Union.
1885 – Troops loyal to The Mahdi conquer Khartoum, killing the Governor-General Charles George Gordon.

1901–present
1905 – The world's largest diamond ever, the Cullinan, which weighs , is found at the Premier Mine near Pretoria in South Africa.
1915 – The Rocky Mountain National Park is established by an act of the U.S. Congress.
1918 – Finnish Civil War: A group of Red Guards hangs a red lantern atop the tower of Helsinki Workers' Hall to symbolically mark the start of the war.
1926 – The first demonstration of the television by John Logie Baird.
1930 – The Indian National Congress declares 26 January as Independence Day or as the day for Poorna Swaraj ("Complete Independence") which occurred 17 years later.
1934 – The Apollo Theater reopens in Harlem, New York City.
  1934   – German–Polish declaration of non-aggression is signed.
1939 – Spanish Civil War: Catalonia Offensive: Troops loyal to nationalist General Francisco Franco and aided by Italy take Barcelona.
1942 – World War II: The first United States forces arrive in Europe, landing in Northern Ireland.
  1945   – World War II: Audie Murphy displays valor and bravery in action for which he will later be awarded the Medal of Honor.
1949 – The Hale telescope at Palomar Observatory sees first light under the direction of Edwin Hubble, becoming the largest aperture optical telescope (until BTA-6 is built in 1976).
1950 – The Constitution of India comes into force, forming a republic. Rajendra Prasad is sworn in as the first President of India. Observed as Republic Day in India.
1952 – Black Saturday in Egypt: rioters burn Cairo's central business district, targeting British and upper-class Egyptian businesses.
1956 – Soviet Union cedes Porkkala back to Finland.
1959 – The  Chain Island is listed for sale by the California State Lands Commission, with a minimum bid of $5,226.
1962 – Ranger 3 is launched to study the Moon. The space probe later misses the moon by 22,000 miles (35,400 km).
1966 – The three Beaumont children disappear from a beach in Glenelg, South Australia, resulting in one of the country's largest-ever police investigations.
1972 – JAT Flight 367 is destroyed by a terrorist bomb, killing 27 of the 28 people on board the DC-9. Flight attendant Vesna Vulović survives with critical injuries.
1974 – Turkish Airlines Flight 301 crashes during takeoff from Izmir Cumaovası Airport (now İzmir Adnan Menderes Airport), killing 66 of the 73 people on board the Fokker F28 Fellowship.
1986 – The Ugandan government of Tito Okello is overthrown by the National Resistance Army, led by Yoweri Museveni.
1991 – Mohamed Siad Barre is removed from power in Somalia, ending centralized government, and is succeeded by Ali Mahdi.
1998 – Lewinsky scandal: On American television, U.S. President Bill Clinton denies having had "sexual relations" with former White House intern Monica Lewinsky.
2001 – The 7.7  Gujarat earthquake shakes Western India, leaving 13,805–20,023 dead and about 166,800 injured.
  2001   – Diane Whipple, a lacrosse coach, is killed in a dog attack in San Francisco. The resulting court case clarified the meaning of implied malice murder.
2009 – Rioting breaks out in Antananarivo, Madagascar, sparking a political crisis that will result in the replacement of President Marc Ravalomanana with Andry Rajoelina.
2009 – Nadya Suleman gives birth to the world's first surviving octuplets.
2015 – An aircraft crashes at Los Llanos Air Base in Albacete, Spain, killing 11 people and injuring 21 others.
  2015   – Syrian civil war: The People's Protection Units (YPG) recaptures the city of Kobanî from the Islamic State of Iraq and the Levant (ISIL), marking a turning point in the Siege of Kobanî.
2020 – A Sikorsky S-76B flying from John Wayne Airport to Camarillo Airport crashes in Calabasas, 30 miles west of Los Angeles, killing all nine people on board, including former five-time NBA champion Kobe Bryant and his daughter Gianna Bryant.
2021 – Protesters and farmers storm the Red Fort near Delhi, clashing with police. One protester is killed and more than 80 police officers are injured.

Births

Pre-1600
 183 – Lady Zhen, wife of Cao Pi (d. 221)
1541 – Florent Chrestien, French poet and translator (d. 1596)
1549 – Jakob Ebert, German theologian (d. 1614)
1582 – Giovanni Lanfranco, Italian painter (d. 1647)

1601–1900
1657 – William Wake, Archbishop of Canterbury (d. 1737)
1714 – Jean-Baptiste Pigalle, French sculptor and educator (d. 1785)
1715 – Claude Adrien Helvétius, French philosopher (d. 1771)
1716 – George Germain, 1st Viscount Sackville, English general and politician, Secretary of State for the Colonies (d. 1785)
1722 – Alexander Carlyle, Scottish minister and author (d. 1805)
1763 – Charles XIV John of Sweden (d. 1844)
1781 – Ludwig Achim von Arnim, German poet and author (d. 1831)
1813 – Juan Pablo Duarte, Dominican philosopher and poet (d. 1876)
1824 – Emil Czyrniański, Polish chemist (d. 1888)
1832 – George Shiras, Jr., American lawyer and jurist (d. 1924)
1842 – François Coppée, French poet and author (d. 1908)
1852 – Pierre Savorgnan de Brazza, Italian-French explorer (d. 1905)
1857 – 12th Dalai Lama (d. 1875)
1861 – Louis Anquetin, French painter (d. 1932)
1864 – József Pusztai, Slovene-Hungarian poet and journalist (d. 1934)
1866 – John Cady, American golfer (d. 1933)
1877 – Kees van Dongen, Dutch painter (d. 1968)
1878 – Dave Nourse, English-South African cricketer and coach (d. 1948)
1880 – Douglas MacArthur, American general, Medal of Honor recipient (d. 1964)
1885 – Michael Considine, Irish-Australian politician (d. 1959)
  1885   – Harry Ricardo, English engineer and academic (d. 1974)
  1885   – Per Thorén, Swedish figure skater (d. 1962)
1887 – François Faber, French-Luxembourgian cyclist (d. 1915)
  1887   – Marc Mitscher, American admiral and pilot (d. 1947)
  1887   – Dimitris Pikionis, Greek architect and academic (d. 1968)
1891 – Frank Costello, Italian-American mob boss (d. 1973)
  1891   – August Froehlich, German priest and martyr (d. 1942)
  1891   – Wilder Penfield, American-Canadian neurosurgeon and academic (d. 1976)
1892 – Bessie Coleman, American pilot (d. 1926)
1893 – Giuseppe Genco Russo, Italian mob boss (d. 1976)
1899 – Günther Reindorff, Russian-Estonian graphic designer and illustrator (d. 1974)
1900 – Karl Ristenpart, German conductor (d. 1967)

1901–present
1902 – Menno ter Braak, Dutch author (d. 1940)
1904 – Ancel Keys, American physiologist and nutritionist (d. 2004)
  1904   – Seán MacBride, Irish lawyer and politician, Irish Minister for External Affairs Nobel Prize laureate (d. 1988)
1905 – Charles Lane, American actor and singer (d. 2007)
  1905   – Maria von Trapp, Austrian-American singer (d. 1987)
1907 – Dimitrios Holevas, Greek priest and philologist (d. 2001)
1908 – Jill Esmond, English actress (d. 1990)
  1908   – Rupprecht Geiger, German painter and sculptor (d. 2009)
  1908   – Stéphane Grappelli, French violinist (d. 1997)
1910 – Jean Image, Hungarian-French animator, director, and screenwriter (d. 1989)
1911 – Polykarp Kusch, German-American physicist and academic, Nobel Prize laureate (d. 1993)
  1911   – Norbert Schultze, German composer and conductor (d. 2002)
1913 – Jimmy Van Heusen, American pianist and composer (d. 1990)
1914 – Dürrüşehvar Sultan, Imperial Princess of the Ottoman Empire (d. 2006)
1915 – William Hopper, American actor (d. 1970)
1917 – Louis Zamperini, American runner and captain (d. 2014)
1918 – Philip José Farmer, American author (d. 2009)
1919 – Valentino Mazzola, Italian footballer (d. 1949)
  1919   – Bill Nicholson, English footballer and manager (d. 2004)
  1919   – Hyun Soong-jong, South Korean politician, 24th Prime Minister of South Korea  (d. 2020)
1920 – Hans Holzer, Austrian-American paranormal researcher and author (d. 2009)
1921 – Eddie Barclay, French record producer, founded Barclay Records (d. 2005)
  1921   – Akio Morita, Japanese businessman, co-founded Sony (d. 1999)
1922 – Michael Bentine, English actor and screenwriter (d. 1996)
  1922   – Seán Flanagan, Irish footballer and politician, 7th Irish Minister for Health (d. 1993)
  1922   – Gil Merrick, English footballer (d. 2010)
1923 – Patrick J. Hannifin, American admiral (d. 2014)
  1923   – Anne Jeffreys, American actress and singer (d. 2017)
1924 – Alice Babs, Swedish singer and actress (d. 2014)
  1924   – Annette Strauss, American philanthropist and politician, Mayor of Dallas (d. 1998)
1925 – David Jenkins, English bishop and theologian (d. 2016)
  1925   – Joan Leslie, American actress (d. 2015)
  1925   – Paul Newman, American actor, activist, director, race car driver, and businessman, co-founded Newman's Own (d. 2008)
  1925   – Ben Pucci, American football player and sportscaster (d. 2013)
  1925   – Claude Ryan, Canadian journalist and politician (d. 2004)
1926 – Farman Fatehpuri, Pakistani linguist and scholar (d. 2013)
  1926   – Joseph Bacon Fraser, Jr., American architect and businessman, co-founded the Sea Pines Company (d. 2014)
1927 – José Azcona del Hoyo, Honduran businessman and politician, President of Honduras (d. 2005)
  1927   – Bob Nieman, American baseball player and scout (d. 1985)
  1927   – Hubert Schieth, German footballer and manager (d. 2013)
1928 – Roger Vadim, French actor and director (d. 2000)
1929 – Jules Feiffer, American cartoonist, playwright, screenwriter, and educator
1933 – Donald Sarason, American mathematician (d. 2017)
1934 – Roger Landry, Canadian businessman and publisher (d. 2020)
  1934   – Charles Marowitz, American director, playwright, and critic (d. 2014)
  1934   – Huey "Piano" Smith, American pianist and songwriter (d. 2023)
  1934   – Bob Uecker, American baseball player, sportscaster and actor
1935 – Corrado Augias, Italian journalist and politician
  1935   – Henry Jordan, American football player (d. 1977)
  1935   – Paula Rego, Portuguese-born British visual artist (d. 2022)  
1936 – Sal Buscema, American illustrator
1937 – Joseph Saidu Momoh, Sierra Leonean soldier and politician, 2nd President of Sierra Leone (d. 2003)
1938 – Henry Jaglom, English-American director and screenwriter
1940 – Séamus Hegarty, Irish bishop (d. 2019)
  1940   – Frank Large, English footballer and cricketer (d. 2003) 
1943 – César Gutiérrez, Venezuelan baseball player and manager (d. 2005)
  1943   – Jack Warner, Trinidadian businessman and politician
1944 – Angela Davis, American activist, academic, and author
  1944   – Jerry Sandusky, American football coach and criminal
1945 – Jacqueline du Pré, English cellist (d. 1987)
  1945   – David Purley, English race car driver (d. 1985)
1946 – Christopher Hampton, Portuguese-English director, screenwriter, and playwright
  1946   – Gene Siskel, American journalist and film critic (d. 1999)
  1946   – Susan Friedlander, American mathematician
1947 – Patrick Dewaere, French actor and composer (d. 1982)
  1947   – Les Ebdon, English chemist and academic
  1947   – Redmond Morris, 4th Baron Killanin, Irish director, producer, and production manager
  1947   – Michel Sardou, French singer-songwriter and actor
1948 – Alda Facio, Costa Rican jurist, writer and teacher
1949 – Jonathan Carroll, American author
  1949   – David Strathairn, American actor
1950 – Jörg Haider, Austrian lawyer and politician, Governor of Carinthia (d. 2008)
  1950   – Jack Youngblood, American football player
1951 – David Briggs, Australian guitarist, songwriter, and producer 
  1951   – Andy Hummel, American singer-songwriter and bass player (d. 2010)
  1951   – Anne Mills, English economist and academic
1953 – Alik L. Alik, Micronesian politician, 7th Vice President of the Federated States of Micronesia
  1953   – Anders Fogh Rasmussen, Danish politician and diplomat, 39th Prime Minister of Denmark
  1953   – Lucinda Williams, American singer-songwriter and guitarist
1954 – Kim Hughes, Australian cricketer
1955 – Eddie Van Halen, Dutch-American guitarist, songwriter, and producer (d. 2020)
1957 – Road Warrior Hawk, American wrestler (d. 2003) 
1958 – Anita Baker, American singer-songwriter 
  1958   – Ellen DeGeneres, American comedian, actress, and talk show host
1961 – Wayne Gretzky, Canadian ice hockey player and coach
  1961   – Tom Keifer, American singer-songwriter and guitarist
1962 – Guo Jian, Chinese-Australian painter, sculptor, and photographer
  1962   – Tim May, Australian cricketer
  1962   – Oscar Ruggeri, Argentinian footballer and manager
1963 – José Mourinho, Portuguese footballer and manager
  1963   – Simon O'Donnell, Australian footballer, cricketer, and sportscaster
  1963   – Tony Parks, English footballer and manager
  1963   – Andrew Ridgeley, English singer-songwriter and guitarist
1964 – Adam Crozier, Scottish businessman
1965 – Kevin McCarthy, American politician, 55th Speaker of the United States House of Representatives
  1965   – Thomas Östros, Swedish businessman and politician
  1965   – Natalia Yurchenko, Russian gymnast and coach
1966 – Kazushige Nagashima, Japanese baseball player and sportscaster
1967 – Anatoly Komm, Russian chef and businessman
  1967   – Col Needham, English businessman, co-founded Internet Movie Database
1968 – Jupiter Apple, Brazilian singer-songwriter, film director, and actor (d. 2015)
1969 – George Dikeoulakos, Greek-Romanian basketball player and coach
1970 – Kirk Franklin, American singer-songwriter and producer 
1973 – Larissa Lowing, Canadian artistic gymnast
  1973   – Melvil Poupaud, French actor, director, and screenwriter
  1973   – Brendan Rodgers, Northern Irish footballer and manager
  1973   – Mayu Shinjo, Japanese author and illustrator
1977 – Vince Carter, American basketball player
  1977   – Justin Gimelstob, American tennis player and coach
1978 – Corina Morariu, American tennis player and sportscaster
1981 – José de Jesús Corona, Mexican footballer
  1981   – Gustavo Dudamel, Venezuelan violinist, composer, and conductor
  1981   – Juan José Haedo, Argentinian cyclist
  1981   – Colin O'Donoghue, Irish actor
1982 – Reggie Hodges, American football player
1983 – Petri Oravainen, Finnish footballer
  1983   – Eric Werner, American ice hockey player
1984 – Ryan Hoffman, Australian rugby league player
  1984   – Iain Turner, Scottish footballer
  1984   – Luo Xuejuan, Chinese swimmer
1985 – Heather Stanning, English rower
1986 – Gerald Green, American basketball player
  1986   – Kim Jae-joong, South Korean singer, songwriter, actor, director and designer
  1986   – Mustapha Yatabaré, French-Malian footballer
1987 – Sebastian Giovinco, Italian footballer
1988 – Dimitrios Chondrokoukis, Greek high jumper
1989 – MarShon Brooks, American basketball player
  1989   – Emily Hughes, American figure skater
1990 – Sergio Pérez, Mexican race car driver
  1990   – Peter Sagan, Slovak professional cyclist
  1990   – Nina Zander, German tennis player
1991 – Manti Te'o, American football player
1992 – Sasha Banks, American wrestler
1993 – Lana Clelland, Scottish footballer 
  1993   – Alice Powell, British racing driver 
  1993   – Florian Thauvin, French footballer
1995 – Sione Katoa, New Zealand rugby league player
1997 – Gedion Zelalem, German-born American soccer player
1998 – Moon Bin, South Korean singer and actor.
2001 – Latalia Bevan, Welsh artistic gymnast
2002 – Darya Astakhova, Russian tennis player
2009 – YaYa Gosselin, American actress
  2009   – The Suleman octuplets

Deaths

Pre-1600
 738 – John of Dailam, Syrian monk and saint (b. 660)
1390 – Adolph IX, Count of Holstein-Kiel (b.c 1327)
1567 – Nicholas Wotton, English courtier and diplomat (b. 1497)

1601–1900
1620 – Amar Singh I, ruler of Mewar (b. 1559)
1630 – Henry Briggs, English mathematician and astronomer (b. 1556)
1641 – Lawrence Hyde, English lawyer (b. 1562)
1697 – Georg Mohr, Danish mathematician and theorist (b. 1640)
1744 – Ludwig Andreas von Khevenhüller, Austrian field marshal (b. 1683)
1750 – Albert Schultens, Dutch philologist and academic (b. 1686)
1795 – Johann Christoph Friedrich Bach, German harpsichord player and composer (b. 1732)
1799 – Gabriel Christie, Scottish general (b. 1722)
1814 – Manuel do Cenáculo, Portuguese prelate and antiquarian (b. 1724)
1823 – Edward Jenner, English physician and immunologist, creator of the smallpox vaccine (b. 1749)
1824 – Théodore Géricault, French painter and lithographer (b. 1791)
1830 – Filippo Castagna, Maltese politician (b. 1765)
1849 – Thomas Lovell Beddoes, English poet, playwright, and physician (b. 1803)
1855 – Gérard de Nerval, French poet and translator (b. 1808)
1860 – Wilhelmine Schröder-Devrient, opera singer (b. 1804)
1869 – Duncan Gordon Boyes, English soldier; Victoria Cross recipient (b. 1846)
1885 – Edward Davy, English-Australian physician and engineer (b. 1806)
  1885   – Charles George Gordon, English general and politician (b. 1833)
1886 – David Rice Atchison, American general and politician (b. 1807)
1887 – Anandi Gopal Joshi, one of the first female Indian physicians (b. 1865)
1891 – Nicolaus Otto, German engineer, invented the Internal combustion engine (b. 1833)
1893 – Abner Doubleday, American general (b. 1819)
1895 – Arthur Cayley, English mathematician and academic (b. 1825)
1896 – James Edwin Campbell, American educator, school administrator, newspaper editor, poet, and essayist (b. 1867)

1901–present
1904 – Whitaker Wright, English businessman (b. 1846)
1920 – Jeanne Hébuterne, French painter and author (b. 1898) 
1932 – William Wrigley, Jr., American businessman, founded the Wrigley Company (b. 1861)
1943 – Harry H. Laughlin, American sociologist and eugenicist (b. 1880)
  1943   – Nikolai Vavilov, Russian botanist and geneticist (b. 1887)
  1946   – Adriaan van Maanen, Dutch-American astronomer and academic (b. 1884)
1947 – Grace Moore, American soprano and actress (b. 1898)
  1948   – Fred Conrad Koch, American biochemist and endocrinologist (born 1876)
1953 – Athanase David, Canadian lawyer and politician (b. 1882)
1962 – Lucky Luciano, Italian-American mob boss (b. 1897)
1968 – Merrill C. Meigs, American publisher (b. 1883)
1973 – Edward G. Robinson, Romanian-American actor (b. 1893)
1976 – João Branco Núncio, Portuguese bullfighter (b. 1901)
1979 – Nelson Rockefeller, American businessman and politician, 41st Vice President of the United States (b. 1908)
1983 – Bear Bryant, American football player and coach (b. 1913)
1985 – Kenny Clarke, American jazz drummer and bandleader (b. 1914)
1986 – Ruben Nirvi, Finnish linguist and professor (b. 1905)
  1990   – Lewis Mumford, American sociologist and historian (b. 1895)
1992 – José Ferrer, Puerto Rican-American actor (b. 1912)
1993 – Jan Gies, Dutch businessman and humanitarian (b. 1905)
  1993   – Jeanne Sauvé, Canadian journalist and politician, Governor General of Canada (b. 1922)
  1996   – Harold Brodkey, American author and academic (b. 1930)
  1996   – Frank Howard, American football player and coach (b. 1909)
  1996   – Henry Lewis, American bassist and conductor (b. 1932)
1997 – Jeane Dixon, American astrologer and psychic (b. 1904)
2000 – Don Budge, American tennis player and coach (b. 1915)
  2000   – Kathleen Hale, English author and illustrator (b. 1898)
  2000   – A. E. van Vogt, Canadian-American author (b. 1912)
2001 – Al McGuire, American basketball player and coach (b. 1928)
2003 – Valeriy Brumel, Russian high jumper (b. 1942)
  2003   – Hugh Trevor-Roper, English historian and academic (b. 1917)
  2003   – George Younger, 4th Viscount Younger of Leckie, Scottish banker and politician, Secretary of State for Scotland (b. 1931)
2004 – Fred Haas, American golfer (b. 1916)
2006 – Khan Abdul Wali Khan, Pakistani politician (b. 1917)
2007 – Gump Worsley, Canadian ice hockey player (b. 1929)
2008 – Viktor Schreckengost, American sculptor and designer (b. 1906)
2010 – Louis Auchincloss, American novelist and essayist (b. 1917)
2011 – David Kato Kisule, Ugandan teacher and LGBT rights activist, considered a father of Uganda's gay rights movement (b. 1964)
  2011   – Charlie Louvin, American singer-songwriter and guitarist (b. 1927)
2012 – Roberto Mieres, Argentinian race car driver (b. 1924)
2013 – Christine M. Jones, American educator and politician (b. 1929)
  2013   – Stefan Kudelski, Polish-Swiss engineer, inventor of the Nagra (b. 1929)
  2013   – Padma Kant Shukla, Indian physicist and academic (b. 1950)
  2013   – Shōtarō Yasuoka, Japanese author (b. 1920)
2014 – Tom Gola, American basketball player, coach, and politician (b. 1933)
  2014   – Paula Gruden, Slovenian-Australian poet and translator (b. 1921)
  2014   – José Emilio Pacheco, Mexican poet and author (b. 1939)
2015 – Cleven "Goodie" Goudeau, American art director and cartoonist (b. 1932)
  2015   – Tom Uren, Australian politician (b. 1921)
2016 – Sahabzada Yaqub Khan, Pakistani military leader, foreign minister, and diplomat (b. 1920)
  2016   – Abe Vigoda, American actor (b. 1921)
2017 – Mike Connors, American actor (b. 1925)
  2017   – Tam Dalyell, Scottish politician (b. 1932)
  2017   – Lindy Delapenha, Jamaican footballer and sports journalist (b. 1927)
  2017   – Barbara Hale, American actress (b. 1922)
  2017   – Barbara Howard, Canadian sprinter and educator (b. 1920)
2020 – John Altobelli, American college baseball coach (b. 1963)
  2020   – Kobe Bryant, American basketball player (b. 1978)

Holidays and observances
 Christian feast day:
 Alberic of Cîteaux
 Blessed Gabriele Allegra
 Paula
 Timothy and Titus
 January 26 (Eastern Orthodox liturgics)
 Australia Day (Australia)
 Duarte Day (Dominican Republic)
 Engineer's Day (Panama) 
 International Customs Day
 Liberation Day (Uganda)
 Republic Day (India)

References

External links

 BBC: On This Day
 
 Historical Events on January 26

Days of the year
January